The Yarrow baronetcy, of Homestead, Hindhead, in Frensham in the County of Surrey, is a hereditary title in the Baronetage of the United Kingdom.

It was created by George V on 29 January 1916 for the shipbuilder and engineer Alfred Yarrow. He was founding Chairman of Yarrow & Co, shipbuilders, of the Isle of Dogs, London and later of Scotstoun, Glasgow.

Sir Eric Yarrow, the third baronet, was a businessman who has been appointed MBE and also served as a Deputy Lieutenant for Renfrewshire.

The actor Damian Lewis is the 1st baronet's great-great-grandson.

Yarrow baronets, of Homestead (1916)
Sir Alfred Fernandez Yarrow, 1st Baronet (1842–1932)
Sir Harold Edgar Yarrow, 2nd Baronet (1884–1962)
Sir Eric Grant Yarrow, 3rd Baronet (1920–2018)
Richard Grant Yarrow (1953–1987)
Sir Ross Yarrow, 4th Baronet (born 1985)
The heir apparent is Henry Yarrow (born 2016), only son of the 4th Baronet.

Arms

References

Kidd, Charles, Williamson, David (editors). Debrett's Peerage and Baronetage (1990 edition). New York: St Martin's Press, 1990.
Burke's Peerage and Baronetage

Baronetcies in the Baronetage of the United Kingdom